= Jhapadiya =

- village
- Location within Madhya Pradesh Location within India
- Coordinates: 23.3818097°N 77.3008506°E
- Country: India
- State: Madhya Pradesh
- District: Bhopal
- Tehsil: Huzur
- Elevation: 507 m (1,663 ft)

Population (2011)
  - Total: 497
- Time zone: UTC+5:30 (IST)
- ISO 3166 code: MP-IN
- 2011 census code: 482375

Jhapadiya is a village in the Bhopal district of Madhya Pradesh, India. It is located in the Huzur tehsil and the Phanda block.

== Demographics ==
According to the 2011 census of India, Jhapadiya has 96 households. The effective literacy rate (i.e. the literacy rate of population excluding children aged 6 and below) is 73.7%.

Demographics (2011 Census)
	Total	Male	Female
Population	497	249	248
Children aged below 6 years	75	33	42
Scheduled caste	62	29	33
Scheduled tribe	0	0	0
Literates	311	184	127
Workers (all)	162	122	40
Main workers (total)	154	119	35
Main workers: Cultivators	86	79	7
Main workers: Agricultural labourers	62	37	25
Main workers: Household industry workers	0	0	0
Main workers: Other	6	3	3
Marginal workers (total)	8	3	5
Marginal workers: Cultivators	0	0	0
Marginal workers: Agricultural labourers	8	3	5
Marginal workers: Household industry workers	0	0	0
Marginal workers: Others	0	0	0
Non-workers	335	127	208
